Quasimesosella ussuriensis is a species of beetle in the family Cerambycidae, and the only species in the genus Quasimesosella. It was described by Cherepanov in 1984.

References

Desmiphorini
Beetles described in 1984
Monotypic beetle genera